Jessi may refer to:

People 
 Jessi (musician) (born 1988), Korean-American rapper, singer, and songwriter
 Gianluigi Jessi (born 1945), Italian basketball player
 Jessi Alexander (born 1976), American country music artist
 Jessi Colter (born 1943), American country music artist
 Jessi Combs (1980–2019), American television personality and metal fabricator
 Jessi Cruickshank (born 1981), Canadian television personality
 Jessi Frey, Finnish singer
 Jessi Jae Joplin, American singer, fashion blogger, model, journalist, and stylist
 Jessi Klein (born 1975), American comedy writer and stand-up comic
 Jessi Lintl (born 1956), Austrian politician
 Jessi Losada, American sportscaster
 Jessi Miley-Dyer (born 1986), Australian surfer

Other uses 
 Jessi (album), 1976, by Jessi Colter

See also 
 Jesse (disambiguation)
 Jessie (disambiguation)